The Indochinese yuhina or chestnut-collared yuhina (Staphida torqueola) is a bird in the family Zosteropidae. The species was first described by Robert Swinhoe in 1870.

References

BirdLife International (2008).  Yuhina torqueola. Downloaded on 6 October 2008.

Indochinese yuhina
Birds of South China
Birds of Laos
Birds of Vietnam
Indochinese yuhina
Taxobox binomials not recognized by IUCN